Omar Banos (born June 26, 1998), known professionally as Cuco, is a Mexican American (Chicano) singer-songwriter and record producer from Hawthorne, California. His fame escalated after releasing "Lo Que Siento" (2017), which attracted over 260 million streams on Spotify alone. Cuco self-released his first two EPs, Wannabewithu (2016) and Songs4u (2017) after graduating from Hawthorne High School. In 2019, he released his first studio album Para Mi with Interscope Records. His music has gained approximately 290.6 million streams according to Nielsen Music. His most recent album, Fantasy Gateway (2022), is his second album to date. It was made with the help of Bad Bunny and Kali Uchis. Some songs include artists like Bratty, DannyLux, Adriel Favela, and Kacey Musgraves.

Early life
Omar Banos was born an only child in Inglewood, California, on June 26, 1998, to immigrant Mexican parents. His mother, Irma, came from the city of Puebla, while his father, Adolfo, came from Mexico City. He grew up in the city of Hawthorne, California, and began playing music at the age of eight. He had experimented with trumpet, guitar, keyboard, drums, bass guitar, mellophone and french horn before the age of 15. Banos attended junior school in Lennox and graduated from Hawthorne High School where he played in the school marching band as well as the jazz band.

Career

2015: Heavy Trip 
After graduating, Banos uploaded a slide guitar cover of Sleep Walk by Santo & Johnny to YouTube, which gained thousands of views. He began producing and releasing songs from his parents' home and releasing them onto Bandcamp and SoundCloud. In January 2015, Banos released his first EP on Bandcamp, titled Heavy Trip. In the same year, Banos had released his first song, "Yeah" on SoundCloud under the moniker of Heavy Trip. He then switched to Cuco, which was a nickname given to him by his mother as a child.

2016–2017: Wannabewithu and Songs4u 
By the age of 18, Banos had self-produced his first mixtape Wannabewithu in 2016, after teaching himself how to use Ableton Live. Cuco released his second mixtape, Songs4u in 2017 when he started playing at clubs in Southern California, selling out his first two venues. Cuco released his first single "Lo Que Siento" in 2017, which has reached over 128 million streams on Spotify alone. Following the success of "Lo Que Siento," Cuco dropped out after a year of attending Santa Monica City College to pursue a career in music.

2019: Para Mi 

Cuco collaborated with American singer Clairo for the single "Drown", which was released in August 2018. He then collaborated with Polyphia on a track called "So Strange" off their album New Levels New Devils, which was released in October 2018. Cuco played alongside saxophonist Kenny G at Coachella in April 2018, as well as at Lollapalooza in October 2018. In February 2019, he collaborated with his childhood Chicano rap idols MC Magic and Lil Rob on a track called "Search". After a bidding war that lasted two years, Banos signed under Interscope Records in March 2019. On April 2, 2019, Cuco released "Hydrocodone," the lead single for Para Mi, before releasing "Bossa No Sé" with Jean Carter on May 22, 2019. Cuco later released his debut studio album, Para Mi, on July 26. The album touches on recent problems that Cuco has experienced first-hand, including a tour bus accident that sent him and his band to hospital. The album debuted at 94 on the US Charts.

Artistry

Musical style and songwriting 
Banos' musical style blends elements of bossa nova and indie pop. Suzy Exposito from Rolling Stone described his music as "psychedelia-soaked love ballads". Brett Calwood told LA Weekly that Banos's music has "smooth Latin influences with a nostalgic lean". Banos blends English and Spanish lyrics over what he describes as "alternative dream pop" melodies that have "a lot of synthesizers" and "a lot of 808's".

Influences 
Banos grew up listening to Chicano rap from names such as Lil Rob, Baby Bash and MC Magic, as well as Spanish rock, boleros and other old ballads that his parents would play around the house. He listens to jazz, classical music and trap music, and has cited Kevin Parker of Tame Impala and Ariel Pink as some of his major musical influences. In an interview with Jesse Thorn from Bullseye, Banos described how the song, "Feels Like We Only Go Backwards"  by Tame Impala helped him with visualizing his career in music and navigating his life in high school.

Discography

Albums

Extended plays

Singles 
As lead artist

As featured artist

Bandcamp releases

Music videos

External links 

 Official website

References 

21st-century American singers
Singer-songwriters from California
Living people
American musicians of Mexican descent
American Internet celebrities
American indie pop musicians
Musicians from Hawthorne, California
Musicians from Inglewood, California
1998 births
Interscope Records artists
Bedroom pop musicians